Saint-Sylvestre-Cappel (Dutch Sint-Silvesterkappel) is a commune in the Nord department in northern France.

Heraldry

See also
 Brasserie de Saint-Sylvestre
 Communes of the Nord department

References

Saintsylvestrecappel
French Flanders